Márk Orosz (born 24 October 1989) is a Hungarian football player. He plays for Ajka in the Nemzeti Bajnokság II. He played his first league match in 2012.

Honours
Ferencváros
 Hungarian League Cup (1): 2012–13

External links
 HLSZ
 MLSZ
 Márk Orosz profile at magyarfutball.hu
 

1989 births
People from Kecskemét
Living people
Hungarian footballers
Association football midfielders
F.C. Crotone players
S.S. Arezzo players
U.S. Catanzaro 1929 players
Cavese 1919 players
Szeged-Csanád Grosics Akadémia footballers
Ferencvárosi TC footballers
Lombard-Pápa TFC footballers
Dunaújváros PASE players
Mezőkövesdi SE footballers
Soroksár SC players
FC Ajka players
Serie C players
Lega Pro Seconda Divisione players
Nemzeti Bajnokság II players
Nemzeti Bajnokság I players
Hungarian expatriate footballers
Expatriate footballers in Italy
Hungarian expatriate sportspeople in Italy
Sportspeople from Bács-Kiskun County